WYAH-LP (93.7 FM) was a radio station licensed to Winchester, Kentucky, United States.  The station was owned by Franklin Avenue Church of the Living God, Inc.

References

External links
 

YAH-LP
YAH-LP
YAH-LP
Defunct religious radio stations in the United States
Defunct radio stations in the United States
Radio stations disestablished in 2008
Winchester, Kentucky